Reindeer Games is the debut album by the Killjoy Club, a hip hop supergroup consisting of Insane Clown Posse (Violent J & Shaggy 2 Dope) and the remaining members of Da Mafia 6ix (DJ Paul, Crunchy Black & Koopsta Knicca). The album was released by Psychopathic Records on September 2, 2014.

Background
In March 2014, DJ Paul announced Da Mafia 6ix and Insane Clown Posse would release a collaboration album in August 2014. In July 2014, during the Insane Clown Posse 2014 GOTJ seminar, it was announced that they had formed a group with Da Mafia 6ix called The Killjoy Club and that their debut album, titled Reindeer Games, would be released on September 2, 2014.

DJ Paul had stated that The Killjoy Club collective was originally slated to be himself, Insane Clown Posse and Houston based rapper Scarface. No specifications were given on why this lineup changed.

Promotion
In August 2014, it was announced Insane Clown Posse and Da Mafia 6ix would be going on tour to promote the album, but doing their own respective sets. They will be going on tour with Mushroomhead, Madchild and JellyRoll titled ShockFest, starting on September 25, 2014, and ending on October 31. On August 14, 2014, the track listing was released, the album features guest appearances from Young Wicked aka Otis of Axe Murder Boyz, Big Hoodoo and Boondox.

Track listing

Personnel
 Violent J - Vocals, Lyrics, Production 
 Shaggy 2 Dope - Vocals, Lyrics, Production
 DJ Paul - Vocals, Lyrics, Production
 Crunchy Black - Vocals, Lyrics, Production
 Koopsta Knicca - Vocals, Lyrics, Production
 Young Wicked - Vocals, Lyrics, Production (3, 4, 5, 6, 7, 8, 9, 11, 12, 13, 15)
 Sugar Slam - Vocals, Lyrics (2, 4, 11, 13)
 Big Hoodoo - Vocals, Lyrics (9, 10)
 Boondox - Vocals, Lyrics (11)
 Kuma - Production (1, 3, 5, 7, 9, 11, 13, 15)
 T—Why - Production (2, 4, 6, 8, 10, 12, 14, 16)
 FNA - Production - (2, 4, 6, 8, 10, 12, 14, 16)
 Seven - Production - (5, 7, 9, 11, 13, 15)

Charts

References

2014 albums
Three 6 Mafia albums
Insane Clown Posse albums
Psychopathic Records albums
Albums produced by DJ Paul
Albums produced by Seven (record producer)